Jinya is a town in Yuzhong County, Lanzhou, China. It administers 17 villages.

A Great Wall watchtower is preserved in Jinya and it is also home to 49 historical courtyard style houses.

References 

Township-level divisions of Gansu
Yuzhong County